Mount Allen is a mountain in the Canadian Rockies, located on the Continental Divide, which forms the provincial boundary between British Columbia and Alberta in this region. J. Monroe Thorington named this mountain for Samuel Evans Stokes Allen in 1924. Allen was an American cartographer who mapped this area of the Rockies in 1894-95. Allen had named this mountain "Shappee", the Stoney language word for "six", as part of his naming of the ten mountains in the Valley of the Ten Peaks. The peak forms part of the backdrop to Moraine Lake in Banff National Park.

Geology

The mountains in Banff Park are composed of sedimentary rock laid down during the Precambrian to Jurassic periods. Formed in shallow seas, this sedimentary rock was pushed east and over the top of younger rock during the Laramide orogeny.

Climate

Based on the Köppen climate classification, the mountain has a subarctic climate with cold, snowy winters, and mild summers. Temperatures can drop below -20 °C with wind chill factors below -30 °C in the winter.

See also
List of mountains of Alberta
Mountains of British Columbia
List of peaks on the Alberta–British Columbia border

Gallery

References

Notes

Further reading

External links
 Parks Canada web site: Banff National Park
 Mount Allen weather: Mountain Forecast
 Samuel E.S. Allen in memoriam: Americanalpineclub.org

Three-thousanders of Alberta
Three-thousanders of British Columbia
Canadian Rockies
Great Divide of North America
Mountains of Banff National Park
Mountains of Yoho National Park